Major General Walter Babington "Sandy" Thomas,  (29 June 1919 – 22 October 2017) was a New Zealand-born British Army officer, who served as General Officer Commanding Far East Land Forces from 1970 to 1971. He previously served with the New Zealand Military Forces in the Second World War, where he was decorated, wounded and, at age 24, became the youngest New Zealand battalion commander of the war.

Military career
Thomas was born in Motueka, New Zealand, on 29 June 1919. He was commissioned into the New Zealand Military Forces at the outbreak of the Second World War. During his service in the Middle East, Thomas was wounded, became a prisoner of war in Crete, escaped from a prison hospital, fled to Syria, and was awarded the Military Cross and Bar. As a temporary major he received the Distinguished Service Order in 1943, and rose to command the 23rd Battalion in Italy to become, at age 24, the youngest New Zealand battalion commander in the war. Thomas ended the war as a lieutenant colonel, and was awarded the United States Silver Star.

After the war Thomas obtained a commission in the Royal Hampshire Regiment and, in 1955, he was mentioned in despatches while dealing with the Mau Mau Uprising in Kenya. He was appointed General Officer Commanding 5th Division in 1968, and Chief of Staff at Headquarters Far East Land Forces in April 1970, before being elevated to be General Officer Commanding Far East Land Forces in October. Thomas was appointed a Companion of the Order of the Bath in 1971, and retired in 1972.

Thomas died at his home in Beaudesert, Queensland, on 22 October 2017 at the age of 98.

References

Bibliography

External links

|-

|-
 

1919 births
2017 deaths
British Army generals
British military personnel of the Mau Mau Uprising
New Zealand Companions of the Distinguished Service Order
Companions of the Order of the Bath
New Zealand military personnel of World War II
People from Motueka
New Zealand recipients of the Military Cross
Recipients of the Silver Star
Royal Hampshire Regiment officers
World War II prisoners of war held by Germany